Marat Sagitovich Zakirov (born November 8, 1973 in Nizhnekamsk, Tatar ASSR) is a Russian water polo player who played on the silver medal squad at the 2000 Summer Olympics and the bronze medal squad at the 2004 Summer Olympics.

See also
 List of Olympic medalists in water polo (men)
 List of World Aquatics Championships medalists in water polo

External links
 

1973 births
Living people
People from Nizhnekamsk
Russian male water polo players
Water polo players at the 2000 Summer Olympics
Water polo players at the 2004 Summer Olympics
Olympic water polo players of Russia
Olympic silver medalists for Russia
Olympic bronze medalists for Russia
Olympic medalists in water polo
Medalists at the 2004 Summer Olympics
Medalists at the 2000 Summer Olympics
Sportspeople from Tatarstan